Mariadas Ruthnaswamy CIE, KCSG (1885–1977) was a leading educationalist, statesman and a writer in Madras (now Chennai, Tamil Nadu), India.

He was educated in Secunderabad, Hyderabad and in Cuddalore in the then Madras Presidency he went on to study in Oxford and Cambridge, ultimately qualifying as a barrister at Gray's Inn, London. In his political career Ruthnaswamy was a Councillor for the Corporation of Madras, then a member of the Madras Legislative Council, being appointed President of the Council in September 1925 after the death of L. D. Swamikannu Pillai. He held office until the following election, in November 1926. He later served on the Madras Service Commission, as Member and later chairman, was nominated as a member of the Central Legislative Assembly, and after independence nominated as a member of the Rajya Sabha (1968–74).

He was initially associated with the Justice Party, and after it was dissolved remained independent until he joined the newly formed Swatantra Party.

From 1942 to 1948 he was the Vice-Chancellor of Annamalai University.

Early life and education
The son of Rai Bahadur M.I. Ruthnaswamy, Ruthnaswamy was educated at St. Anne's School, Secunderabad; he later went on to matriculate at St. Joseph's College, Cuddalore in 1903, completing his graduation from Nizam's College, Hyderabad in 1907. While at school and college, he was declared on several occasions as the best orator, and was also prominent in cultural activities. In 1907, he secured admission in Jesus College, Oxford, and left for England, later shifting to the University of Cambridge to complete his History Tripos in 1910. At the same time he enrolled himself in Gray's Inn (1907–1910) and returned to India as a barrister (Bar at Law) in 1911. He was determined not to practice Law in spite of compulsion from his father.

Educationist, administrator and politician
Ruthnaswamy became a Councillor, Corporation of Madras in 1921 a position he held till 1923. It was also in 1921 that the post of Principal, Pachiappa's College was offered, he was to become the first Indian Principal of that institution, the position that he successfully held till 1927. During his period in the Madras Legislative Assembly, he was known for his wit and quick repartee, when Sir K Venkatareddi Nayadu made a remark that he had delivered 200 lectures, Ruthnaswamy was quick to reply "Is any Minister justified in inflicting lectures upon the electorate?" In the previous year Mr S Satyamurthy declared "We fought as Swarajists...." Then Mr Abbas Ali said 'We fought as Muhammedans" Ruthnaswamy enquired 'Whether the Muhammedans could have fought the elections as any other than Muhammadans "

In 1925, Ruthnaswamy was elected President, Madras Legislative Council at a young age of 40, which he was to hold with distinction for a year. The Madras Legislative Council with 132 members had luminaries like S. Satyamurthi, Raja of Panagal, PT Rajan, S. Srinivasa Ayyangar, Arcot Ramaswami Mudaliar and Dr P Subbarayan among others. The Governor had a 4 Member Executive Council -N E Majoribanks (Revenue), Khan Bahadur Mohammad Usman of Madras (Home), T E Moir (Finance)and A.Y.G. Campbell (Law). Chief Minister was Raja of Panagal two other Ministers being A.P Patro and T N Sivagnanam Pillai. Recognising his manifold talents in Constitutional Law, he was nominated as Member, Central Legislative Assembly in 1927. In 1928 he became the first Indian Principal, Madras Law College, Madras, a position that was held by Ruthnaswamy till 1930. In 1930 Ruthnaswamy became Member, Madras Service Commission, a post he held with distinction for 12 years (till 1942). The Madras Service Commission was the forerunner on the present day Tamil Nadu Public Service Commission. Madras Service Commission came into being through an Act in 1929, the Madras Presidency had the unique honour of being the first among all the Presidencies to establish a Service Commission. It had 3 Members.  Soon after leaving the Madras Service Commission, he became Vice-Chancellor, Annamalai University, which he held for 2 terms – 1942–1948

Editor, journalist and writer
Ruthnaswamy was a prolific writer known for his erudition and breath of vision, seen both in his books and as an Editor and journalist. He contributed his knowledge liberally to national newspapers like Sunday Standard and Statesman, political journals like Swaraja and local newspapers like Madras Mail among others. He was –
Editor, Standard, 1921–1923
Editor, Democracy, 1950–1955
Editor, Tamil Nadu, 1951–1955
Editor, Thondan, 1972

During the intervening years before becoming active again in politics Professor Ruthnaswamy with his eclectic range of subjects gave talks both in India and abroad one such was to East – West Society on "Indian culture" in Singapore reported by the Singapore newspaper Straits Times.

Swatantra years
Ruthnaswamy was not a believer in Nehruvian socialism which led to "permit raj" which meant government's role in commanding heights of the economy. Once the formation of the Swatantra Party was announced in Madras on 6 June 1959 by C. Rajagopalachari and  Minoo Masani, one of the earliest members were Ruthnaswamy, NG Ranga, Field Marshal K. M. Cariappa and the Maharaja of Patiala. Prof. N.G. Ranga one of the founders of the Swatantra Party mentioned, "Decades later, when we formed the Swatantra Party with the blessings of Sri Rajagopalachari... with myself as the President, Ruthnaswami was good enough to join it and we were all happy to elect him as its Vice-President..... We elected Ruthnaswami to the Rajya Sabha for 2 terms.. He was however eloquent and persuasive advocate. He was listened to with great respect. Ruthnaswami wanted priority to be given to coordination of opposition because he was particular about bi-partisan Parliamentarianism. All our efforts to help Swatantra, Janata, B.K.D and Praja parties to combine or to coordinate failed... Ruthnaswami felt deeply disappointed about the prospects for Indian democracy Erdman in his book was to remark "..highly regarded was Ruthnaswamy one of the founding fathers of Swatantra...Ruthnaswamy remained aloof from organised politics until Swatantra was established. Ruthnaswamy with Dahyabhai Patel, he was Swatantra's ablest spokesman in the Rajya Sabha, and after the resignation of Paliwal, was named as the Vice-President of the party"

His speeches in Parliament covered a wide range of subject, clear and incisive, for instance on Railways "as for the chronic overcrowding in third class carriages, it was the routine complaint of the representatives of the people against the old British Administration. It is tragic to find this complaint has still justification in these years of freedom and independence"( Speech on Railway Budget – 24 March 1962). On Foreign policy " Now, the independence of Tibet is absolutely necessary for the defence of India.  ....we should have protested against the occupation of Tibet by China.... we allowed Tibet to be gobbled up by China" (Speech on Foreign Affairs- 23 June 1962) a few months later China attacked India on 20 October 1962 with disastrous consequences, on University Grants Commission (Speech on University Grants Commission – 23 June 1962) Decrying less money was spent for the endowment of teaching, that  "buildings seem to be the preoccupation of our Vice-Chancellors and our Senates and academic councils", he was to foresee what was to happen 50 years later when Vice-Chancellor, University of Hyderabad went further when he spent a whopping sum of Rs 30.1 million on renovation of his bungalow by reducing amount to be spent on research and scholarships

Honours conferred
Ruthnaswamy was decorated as a Companion of the Order of the Indian Empire (CIE) in 1930. In 1937, Pope Pius XI conferred the Knight Commander's Cross of the Order of St. Gregory the Great (KCSG) on him. This honour is conferred on Catholics and non-Catholics alike. In 1968, the Government of India conferred Ruthnaswamy with the Padma Bhushan for Literature and Education One of the rare occasions when the Leader of the Opposition (Rajya Sabha) was conferred such an award.

Legacy
In Prof. N.G. Ranga Papers the veteran Parliamentarian who held the Guinness World Record for being the longest serving Parliamentarian mentions "Prof. M. Ruthnaswami lived as a exemplary scholar, educationalist, administrator and champion of backward classes and minorities. Ruthnaswami proved to be an efficient Principal (in Pachiappas College) a good Professor of History and Politics....subsequently as Principal of the prestigious (Madras) Law College.. he proved to be as great a success. After that successful career, the Madras Government appointed him successively as a Member and Chairman of the Public Service Commission. He rose to be Vice-Chancellor of Annamalai University. Ruthnaswami proved to be a great administrator in all these three (positions) All three of us (C.Rajagopalachari, Prof. M. Ruthnaswami and Prof. N.G. Ranga)..  us have been social revolutionaries. Prof Ruthnaswamy and myself stood for "Self Respect" and uplift of the socially Backward Classes and non-caste social hegemony in Indian democracy...He was socially related to my old friend Sri(R.N.) Arogyaswami Mudaliar .. all three of us used to meet as good friends and exchange thoughts in good humour
Lawrence Sundaram in his book Anjali mentions "Apart from his brilliance as a scholar and writer, Mr Ruthnaswamy was a man of solid personal religious faith....He had an intellectual sharpness of a Newman... Adjectives like "pious" or "devoted"or exemplary" are too weak to describe the manly robustness with which he practised his religious beliefs. An untiring reader of books on all subjects he wrote and spoke with a command of his matter, that came from the vastness of his reading and his assimilation of it. His mind was alert when his body was enfeebled even at the age of 93 and till the end he wielded his pen with a mastery that others could envy from a great distance

Writings
Books written by Ruthnaswamy included,
Philosophy of Mahatma Gandhi – (1923),
The revision of the Constitution- (1928)
Making of the State          – (1932),
Influences on the British Administrative system  – (1932),
India from the dawn                              – (1949),
Principles and Practice of Public Administration – (1953),
Truth shall prevail                              – (1957)
Everyman's Constitution of India                 – (1958),
Principles and Practice of Foreign Policy        – (1961),
India after God                                  – (1964),
Violence – Cause and cure                        – (1969),
Agenda for India                                 – (1971)

References

Prof. N.G. Ranga, M.P "Homage to Dr. M. Ruthnaswami, ex-M.P.a noble colleague in Swatantra (Party) movement" Prof. N.G. Ranga Papers, pp. 432–435, National Archives, New Delhi
T.S. Gopal "Memories on Sastri Hall" my-mylapore.blogspot.in (2005)
Pachiappas College "Annual Quality Assurance Report"(2010–2011)
The Straits Times, Singapore "Indian culture" 27 July 1955
Legislative Council Secretariat, Madras "Wit and humour in the Tamilnadu Legislative Council " Volume 1 Pg 24, 29 & 32
Valampuri John "Prof. Ruthnaswamy – A Parliamentarian" A dissertation for Master of Philosophy, Pachaiyappas's College, Madras (1992)
INFA Publications, New Delhi "India's Who's Who" 1971
Rajya Sabha's Who's Who, Rajya Sabha Secretariat, New Delhi 1966
Times of India, Delhi edition, 17 August 2013, Pg 21
M. Ruthnaswamy "Eighteen months in Parliament" 7A, Andhra Mahila Press, Rosary Church Road, Madras-4 (1965)
V. Lawrence Sundaram S.J "Anjali" Gujarat Sahitya Prakash, Anand, Gujarat 1993
Madras Legislative Council 1–17 September 1926, National Archives, New Delhi, India

Members of the Madras Legislative Council
Rajya Sabha members from Tamil Nadu
Politicians from Chennai
20th-century Indian educational theorists
Companions of the Order of the Indian Empire
Recipients of the Padma Bhushan in literature & education
Swatantra Party politicians
Members of Gray's Inn
1885 births
1977 deaths
20th-century Indian politicians